is mountain in Nagano Prefecture, Japan. A part of the Kirigamine volcano and is the highest point.

The north-west side is covered with forest. The south-east side of Kurumayama is grassy which allows easy paragliding. The car access to the bottom of Kurumayama does not require the four-wheel drive, but at heavy snow, snow chains may help a lot.

References 

Mountains of Nagano Prefecture